The Grammy Award for Best Spoken Word Album for Children was an honor presented at the Grammy Awards, a ceremony that was established in 1958 and originally called the Gramophone Awards, to recording artists for works containing quality "spoken word" performances aimed at children. Honors in several categories are presented at the ceremony annually by the National Academy of Recording Arts and Sciences of the United States to "honor artistic achievement, technical proficiency and overall excellence in the recording industry, without regard to album sales or chart position."

The award was first presented to Audrey Hepburn and producers Deborah Raffin and Michael Viner in 1994 for the album Audrey Hepburn's Enchanted Tales. Its last winners were the artists, producers, audio engineers, and audio mixers who contributed to the album Julie Andrews' Collection of Poems, Songs, and Lullabies in 2011, when it was announced the award would be combined with the Grammy Award for Best Musical Album for Children to form the Grammy Award for Best Children's Album.

Tom Chapin holds the record for the most wins in this category, with a total of three. Artists Bill Harley and Jim Dale, along with audio engineer David Correia, and producers Arnold Cardillo and David Rapkin, and audio engineer-musical director Rory Young, are the others to win the award more than once, all winning it twice. Former U.S. President Bill Clinton has also won the award, along with Mikhail Gorbachev and Sophia Loren, for their work on the album Wolf Tracks and Peter and the Wolf at the 2003 installment of the awards.

Recipients

 Each year is linked to the article about the Grammy Awards held that year.

See also
Grammy Award for Best Spoken Word Album

References

General
 

Specific

External links
Official site of the Grammy Awards

 
Spoken Word Album For Children
Spoken word albums
Children's albums
Album awards
Audiobook awards